The Centene Community Ice Center is a multi-purpose facility in Maryland Heights, Missouri in greater St. Louis. It is located off Highway 141 near Hollywood Casino St. Louis and the Hollywood Casino Amphitheatre. Built at a cost of $83 million, the complex opened in September 2019. It is co-owned by the city of Maryland Heights, St. Louis County, the Blues, and the non-profit Legacy Ice Foundation, and operated by Spectra.

The center features four rinks: a "feature" rink with 2,500 tip-up seats and a four-sided HD video scoreboard, the Blues' main practice rink with seating for 750, the Bob Plager Community Rink with bleacher seating for 400 and dedicated access for sled hockey, and "The Barn", a covered outdoor rink with a 4,000 seat grandstand. During the hockey off-season The Barn is converted into the St. Louis Music Park, a concert venue with a 4,500 capacity. The complex also contains a fitness center, sports medicine clinic, studios for WXOS radio, a Bauer Hockey retail shop, a bar named 314 Social, and a Schnucks Express grocery outlet. It is the practice facility for the St. Louis Blues, as well as home ice for Lindenwood University's men's and women's ice hockey teams. Local hockey tenants include the St. Louis AAA Blues and Lady Blues elite programs, the Blues' affiliated disabled hockey teams (DASA Blues Sled Hockey, Gateway Locomotives Special Hockey, and Blues Blind Hockey), the St. Louis Lady Cyclones girls' hockey club, and in-house programs such as learn-to-skate, learn-to-play, and recreational leagues.

References

External links
 Centene Community Ice Center home page

Indoor arenas in Missouri
Indoor ice hockey venues in the United States
College ice hockey venues in the United States
National Hockey League practice facilities
Buildings and structures in St. Charles County, Missouri
Sports venues completed in 2019
Lindenwood Lions ice hockey
2019 establishments in Missouri
St. Louis Blues